Tetu Lake is a lake in Kenora District in northwestern Ontario, Canada.

See also
List of lakes in Ontario

References

Lakes of Kenora District